Reuben Adeleye Abati (born 7 November 1965) is a Nigerian Journalist, Politician, Television Anchor and Newspaper Columnist. He was the Peoples Democratic Party (PDP)'s Deputy Governorship candidate in Ogun State for the 2019 Gubernatorial election. Abati was Special Adviser on Media and Publicity to President Goodluck Jonathan of Nigeria between Year 2011 and 2015 . He was previously a newspaper columnist and the chairman of the editorial board of the Nigerian newspaper The Guardian from 2001 to 2011. He is a graduate of Theater Arts from the University of Calabar. Equally important, Reuben Abati is a Senior Research Associate with the Olusegun Obasanjo Centre for Cultural Studies and  National Open University of Nigeria (NOUN).

Education 
Abati graduated from the University of Calabar, Nigeria in 1985. He later studied at the University of Ibadan as a University Scholar.

He holds a PhD in Theatre Arts, specializing in Dramatic Literature, Theory and Criticism from the University of Ibadan (1990); a bachelor's degree in Law from Lagos State University, Lagos (1999); a professional training certificate in journalism from the College of Journalism, University of Maryland, College Park, United States (1996–97); and a Certificate in Management and Leadership from the Said Business School, University of Oxford (2015).

Career 
While serving as Chairman, Editorial Board and Editorial Page Editor of The Guardian Newspapers, for more than ten years, and later as Special Adviser, Media and Publicity and Official Spokesperson in the Nigerian Presidency (2011-2015), he was responsible for a whole range of tasks including articulation and execution of policy, determination of editorial direction, crisis management, media management, communications and team management.

Between 2000 and 2011, Reuben Abati was a member and co-presenter of the television discussion programme, Patito's Gang, founded by Professor Pat Utomi. Between 2003 and 2007,  he served as a member of the Governing Council of Olabisi Onabanjo University, Ago-Iwoye, Ogun State and was a member of the Board of the Lagos State Security Trust Fund (2007-2011).

Reuben Abati has been writing for the Nigerian press since 1985, serving as Contributing Editor, Editor, and Columnist to many publications, covering both the mainstream media and the softer genre of romance and lifestyle magazines. He is very well known for his book reviews, essays and commentaries on national, regional and international affairs. His writings have also appeared in both local and international periodicals and academic journals.

Before working in government, Reuben Abati was Chairman of the Editorial Board at The Guardian Newspapers, a privately owned, independent Nigerian newspaper from 2000-2011. He also served at The Guardian as Editorial Page Editor, and as a columnist, running two columns per week.  Abati is a recipient of many prizes for journalistic excellence. They include the Hadj Alade Odunewu/Diamond Award for Media Excellence Prize for Informed Commentary (which he has won four times), the Cecil King Memorial Prize for Print Journalist of the Year (1998), the Fletcher Challenge Commonwealth Prize for Opinion Writing  (2000), the Freedom Peace Prize for Journalism (2010) and The Red Media Africa Living Legends Industry Award (2015)

Early career life 
Abati originally started his career as a university teacher, teaching courses in Dramaturgy, Theory and Criticism, Special Author Studies, and the Sociology of Literature at the Olabisi Onabajo University, Ago-Iwoye, Ogun State, South West Nigeria, before embarking on other fields of interest. He is a member of the Nigerian Institute of Management, the Nigeria Union of Journalists, and the Nigerian Guild of Editors. He is also a Hubert H. Humphrey Fellow, a Fellow of the 21st Century Trust, a Fellow of The Nigeria Leadership Initiative and a member of the Aspen Global Leadership Network. He is an Honorary Fellow of the Nigerian Academy of Letters.

Working with the Presidency 
In 2011, he was appointed Special Adviser, Media and Publicity and as Official Spokesperson to President Goodluck Jonathan of Nigeria. In that capacity, he was responsible for managing the President's media office, media relations and leading the Presidency's public communications team.

Post Presidency media work 
After his stint in government, Reuben Abati returned to journalism, writing his regular two columns in The Guardian newspaper (Fridays and Sundays). He subsequently moved to ThisDay newspaper where he now writes a Tuesday column titled: TuesdayWithReubenAbati. He is an Anchor with Arise News on the program, "The Morning Show", alongside Ojy Okpe. He also runs a website: reubenabati.com.ng, and 
posts regularly on instagram and twitter as @abati1990. He is actively engaged as a consultant on media and public policy issues.

References

External links
Abati's page on Nigerian Village Square

Living people
People from Abeokuta
Nigerian newspaper journalists
Yoruba journalists
University of Calabar alumni
1965 births
Jonathan administration personnel
Nigerian expatriates in the United States
Nigerian politicians
Nigerian television presenters
Nigeria political journalists